Ali Alipour Ghara (born 11 November 1995) is an Iranian international footballer who plays as a forward for Gil Vicente.

At the age of 19 years and 185 days, Alipour was the youngest-ever player to score in the Tehran derby after scoring in Persepolis' 1–0 victory on 15 May 2015. He is the only player in Tehran derby history who has scored the winning goal in two derby matches.

Club career
Alipour started his career with Nassaji Mazandaran. He made his professional debut in 2012 at the age of 16 with Azadegan League club Sang Ahan Bafq.

Persepolis

Alipour signed with Persepolis in January 2015. AHe scored his first goal for the club on 11 March 2015 in a 2–2 draw against Naft Masjed Soleyman. On 15 May, Alipour scored in the Tehran derby against Esteghlal, making him the youngest player to score in the Tehran derby at 19 years old. On 26 March 2016, Alipour scored his first hat-trick for the club in a 6–4 friendly win against Omani champions Al-Oruba.

He was the Persian Gulf Pro League top goalscorer in 2017–18, tallying 19 goals.

C.S. Marítimo
On 28 September 2020, Alipour joined Portuguese Primeira Liga club Marítimo on a two-year deal.

International career

Alipour was called up to the Iran national football team in March 2017. He made his debut against Sierra Leone on 17 March 2018 in a friendly match.

Career statistics

Club

International

Honours
 Persepolis
 Persian Gulf Pro League: 2016–17, 2017–18, 2018–19, 2019–20
 Hazfi Cup: 2018–19
 Iranian Super Cup: 2017, 2018, 2019
AFC Champions League runner-up: 2018

 Individual
 Persian Gulf Pro League Top Goalscorer: 2017–18
 Persian Gulf Pro League Team of the Year: 2017–18
 Persian Gulf Pro League Best Striker of the Year: 2017–18
 Navad Player of the Month: September 2017, October 2017

References

External links

Ali Alipour at Persian League

1995 births
Living people
Iranian footballers
People from Qaem Shahr
Association football forwards
Nassaji Mazandaran players
Steel Azin F.C. players
Yazd Louleh F.C. players
Rah Ahan players
Persepolis F.C. players
C.S. Marítimo players
Persian Gulf Pro League players
Azadegan League players
Primeira Liga players
Iran international footballers
Iran under-20 international footballers
Iran youth international footballers
Iranian expatriate footballers
Expatriate footballers in Portugal
Sportspeople from Mazandaran province
Gil Vicente F.C. players
Iranian expatriate sportspeople in Portugal